Esther Thyssen (born 31 July 1979) is a German former ice hockey player. She competed in the women's tournament at the 2002 Winter Olympics.

References

External links
 

1979 births
Living people
German women's ice hockey players
Olympic ice hockey players of Germany
Ice hockey players at the 2002 Winter Olympics
Sportspeople from Krefeld
21st-century German women